This is a list of the National Register of Historic Places listings in Sevier County, Utah.

This is intended to be a complete list of the properties and districts on the National Register of Historic Places in Sevier County, Utah, United States. Latitude and longitude coordinates are provided for many National Register properties and districts; these locations may be seen together in a map.

Sevier County and Sanpete County make up the "Little Scandinavia" portion of Utah, where many of Utah's 20,000 Scandinavian immigrants during the 19th century settled.  Pair-houses, a Scandinavian home form, are relatively more common here than elsewhere in Utah.

There are 25 properties and districts listed on the National Register in the county. Another 4 sites in the county were once listed, but have since been removed.



Current listings

|}

Former listings

|}

See also
 List of National Historic Landmarks in Utah
 National Register of Historic Places listings in Utah

References

External links

Sevier